Stepan Dmitriyevich Nechayev (1792–1860) was a Procurator of the Most Holy Synod and a senator. Nechayev was the first one to study the materials about the Kulikovo Field. 

He picked up some findings on the place of the Battle of Kulikovo and created a private museum in the Palace Polibino, using those findings. 

He was the first historian, who carried out the location researches and tried to connect the description of the Battle of Kulikovo  with the real landscape. 

There are records about some other collections of the archeological findings from the Kulikovo Field, part of which was in his possession.

See also 
Polibino, Lipetsk Oblast
Yury Nechaev-Maltsov

External links
The Battle of Kulikovo
Kulikovo Pole and Stepan Nechayev

Senators of the Russian Empire
1792 births
Historians from the Russian Empire
Male writers from the Russian Empire
Philanthropists from the Russian Empire
1860 deaths
Most Holy Synod
19th-century philanthropists